Omar Said Al-Hassan is the Chairman of the Gulf Centre for Strategic Studies, a London-based think tank which gathers, and publishes information about the Persian Gulf states, and Arab issues in general.

See also
International relations

References

External links
   - The Gulf Centre For Strategic Studies Website.

Living people
Year of birth missing (living people)
Place of birth missing (living people)